Kim Sung-joo (Hangul: 김성주; Sungjoo Kim; born 1956 in Daegu, Korea) – Founder, Chairwoman and Chief Visionary Officer of Sungjoo Group (founded 1990) and MCM Holding AG. In 2005 Sungjoo Group acquired MCM Holding AG, a German luxury fashion brand founded in Munich in 1976.

Kim was selected as a Global Leader of Tomorrow by the World Economic Forum in Davos in 1997 and received the Ethics in Business Award from the EU government in 2009. In 2012 she was listed in Forbes’ Top 50 Asian Business Women, selected as one of Asia's 25 Hottest CEOs by Fortune and invited by the United Nations be part of “Innovation 101” at the Decide Now Act summit. Kim served as Co-Chair of the Presidential Campaign Committee for Park Geun-hye.

In 2014 Kim was named president of the Korean Red Cross, the first female to hold the post. In 2015, received an honorary Officer of the Order of the British Empire (OBE) for her contribution to strengthening bilateral ties between the United Kingdom and the Republic of Korea.

Published works

Awards
1997: "Global Leaders for Tomorrow" by World Economic Forum
1999: "The 20 Most Powerful International Businesswomen" by Working Woman
2001: "7 most powerful women in Asia" by Asiaweek
2002: "Pride of Korea Grand Prize Winner" by Korean Press Association
2003: "New Century Leaders" by CNN for The Best of Asia
2004: "75 Top Powerful Women Around the World" by Bilanz
2004: "Woman of the Year Award" from the Korean National Council of Women
2005: "Korean Women Leadership Award" for Young Leader, from YWCA Korea
2007: "Spirit of Asian America" Gala Honorees by AAFNY (Asian American Federation of New York)
2007: "100 People to Enlighten the world 2007" by Korean Green Foundation
2008: "WLE Compass Award" by Women's Leadership Exchange
2011: Doctor Honoris Causa from Business School Lausanne
2015: "Honorary Officer of the Order of the British Empire"

References

External links 
 
 

1956 births
Living people
South Korean chief executives
South Korean women in business
Amherst College alumni
20th-century South Korean businesspeople
21st-century South Korean businesspeople
20th-century businesswomen
21st-century businesswomen